Nicola Joy Nadia Benedetti  (born 20 July 1987) is an Italian-Scottish classical solo violinist and festival director. Her ability was recognised when she was a child, including the award of BBC Young Musician of the Year when she was 16. She works with orchestras in Europe and America as well as with Alexei Grynyuk, her regular pianist. Since 2012, she has played the Gariel Stradivarius violin. She became the first woman and first Scottish person to lead the Edinburgh International Festival when she was made Festival Director on 1 October 2022.

Early life and education
Benedetti was born in West Kilbride, North Ayrshire, Scotland, to an Italian father and an Italian-Scottish mother. She started to play the violin at the age of four with lessons from Brenda Smith. At eight, she became the leader of the National Children's Orchestra of Great Britain. By the age of nine, she had already passed the eight grades of musical examinations while attending the independent Wellington School, Ayr, and, in September 1997, began to study at the Yehudi Menuhin School for young musicians under Lord Menuhin and Natasha Boyarskaya in rural Surrey, England.

At the end of her first year (1998), she played solo in the school's annual concert at Wigmore Hall, and performed in London and Paris as a soloist in Bach's Double Violin Concerto with Alina Ibragimova. She played in a memorial concert at Westminster Abbey celebrating the life and work of Yehudi Menuhin.

In 2000, she competed in the Menuhin Competition as a junior competitor.

Nicola has an older sister, Stephanie, who is also a violinist and a member of the pop group Clean Bandit.

Early public performances
In 1999, Benedetti performed for the anniversary celebrations at Holyrood Palace with the National Youth Orchestra of Scotland.
In 2000, Benedetti performed with the Royal Scottish National Orchestra and the Scottish Opera.

Subsequent performances followed with the City of London Sinfonia, the Royal Philharmonic Orchestra, Scottish Opera, Scottish Chamber Orchestra, Royal Scottish National Orchestra, etc.

In August 2002, she won the UK's Brilliant Prodigy Competition, broadcast by Carlton Television. She left the Menuhin School shortly after and, at the age of 15, began studying privately with Maciej Rakowski, the former leader of the English Chamber Orchestra.

In spring 2003, Benedetti, invited as a soloist by the London Symphony Orchestra, participated in the recording of the DVD titled Barbie of Swan Lake at Abbey Road Studios. In October 2003, as the extra feature on this DVD, "Playing With Passion" was filmed and released by Mattel. BBC Scotland, using this DVD, created a documentary on Benedetti, which was broadcast on television in the UK in March 2004.

BBC Young Musician of the Year
In May 2004, at the age of 16, Benedetti won the BBC Young Musician of the Year competition, performing Karol Szymanowski's First Violin Concerto in the final at the Usher Hall in Edinburgh, with the BBC Scottish Symphony Orchestra. As a result of gaining the award, she came first in the music section of the Top Scot award in December 2005. Despite winning the competition, The Times reported that Benedetti was snubbed by Jack McConnell, the then First Minister of Scotland, who thought that there was insufficient public interest to merit a personal message of congratulations. Following a public and political outcry, McConnell bowed to the pressure and telephoned Benedetti to acknowledge her success.

Since 2012
In September 2012, she performed at the Last Night of the Proms, playing Violin Concerto No. 1 by Max Bruch. That same year, Benedetti was lent the 1717 "Gariel" Stradivarius by London banker and London Symphony Orchestra Board member Jonathan Moulds.

Apart from solo performances, Benedetti performs in a trio with the German cellist Leonard Elschenbroich and the British-Ukrainian pianist Alexei Grynyuk.

Artistic recognition

Nicola was chosen as the subject for the winner of the Sky Arts Portrait Artist of the Year 2021, Calum Stevenson, and this portrait now hangs in the Scottish National Portrait Gallery.

Honours and awards

Benedetti was awarded honorary doctorates from Glasgow Caledonian University in November 2007 and from Heriot-Watt University in 2010; she was also awarded honorary degrees from the University of Edinburgh in November 2011. She was awarded an honorary degree from the University of York in August 2020.

She was made a Member of the Order of the British Empire (MBE) in the 2013 New Year's Honours "For services to Music and to charity", and was elected an honorary fellow of the Royal Society of Edinburgh in March 2017. In 2015, she was listed as one of BBC's 100 Women.

In May 2017, she was presented with the Queen's Medal for Music, the youngest of the twelve people to receive the award since it was established in 2005.

She was made a Commander of the Order of the British Empire (CBE) in the 2019 New Year Honours, "For services to Music". In 2019 she was also given the annual Royal Medal award by the Royal Society of Edinburgh for improving the lives of deprived Scottish children through Sistema Scotland and the Big Noise Orchestras. 

In 2020, she won the Grammy for best classical instrumental solo for Marsalis: Violin Concerto; Fiddle Dance Suite.

She was awarded the 2021 ISM Distinguished Musician Award. 

In 2022, she was appointed honorary president of the  Royal Conservatoire of Scotland (RCS).

Personal life
Nicola was in a relationship with German cellist Leonard Elschenbroich, whom she met at the Yehudi Menuhin School of Music. Although that relationship has ended, they continue to perform together and are good friends.

Discography

Albums

References

External links

Julie Amacher, "New Classical Tracks: Nicola Benedetti", Minnesota Public Radio, 9 May 2006
On-line video interview for Czech TV, 5 December 2010
 Nicola Benedetti biography and albums at cosmopolis.ch

1987 births
Living people
20th-century classical violinists
20th-century Scottish women musicians
21st-century classical violinists
21st-century Scottish women musicians
BBC 100 Women
Child classical musicians
Commanders of the Order of the British Empire
Grammy Award winners
Italian British musicians
People associated with Glasgow Caledonian University
People associated with Heriot-Watt University
People associated with the University of Edinburgh
People associated with the University of York
People educated at Wellington School, Ayr
People educated at Yehudi Menuhin School
People from North Ayrshire
Scottish classical violinists
Scottish people of Italian descent